Abigail Bauleke (born July 31, 2001) is an American wheelchair basketball player. She represented the United States at the 2020 Summer Paralympics.

Career
In May 2019 she represented the U25 Women's team at the 2019 Women's U25 Wheelchair Basketball World Championship and won a gold medal.

Bauleke represented the United States at the 2020 Summer Paralympics in the wheelchair basketball women's tournament and won a bronze medal.

References

2001 births
Living people
Basketball players from Minneapolis
American women's wheelchair basketball players
Paralympic wheelchair basketball players of the United States
Wheelchair basketball players at the 2020 Summer Paralympics
Medalists at the 2020 Summer Paralympics
Paralympic medalists in wheelchair basketball
Paralympic bronze medalists for the United States
People with paraplegia
21st-century American women